The 2021–22 SIU Edwardsville Cougars men's basketball team represented Southern Illinois University Edwardsville in the 2021–22 NCAA Division I men's basketball season. The Cougars, led by third-year head coach Brian Barone, played their home games at the First Community Arena in Edwardsville, Illinois as members of the Ohio Valley Conference. They finished the season 11–21, 4–13 in OVC play to finish in eighth place. They lost in the first round of the OVC tournament to Tennessee State.

Previous season
In a season limited due to the ongoing COVID-19 pandemic, the Cougars finished the 2020–21 season 9–17, 7–12 in OVC play to finish in eighth place. In the first round of the OVC tournament, they were defeated by Belmont.

Roster

Schedule and results

|-
!colspan=12 style=| Exhibition

|-
!colspan=12 style=| Non-conference regular season

|-
!colspan=9 style=| Ohio Valley regular season

|-
!colspan=12 style=| Ohio Valley tournament

Source

References

SIU Edwardsville Cougars men's basketball seasons
SIU Edwardsville
SIU Edwardsville Cougars men's basketball
SIU Edwardsville Cougars men's basketball